Purdue University (or simply Purdue) is a public land-grant research university in West Lafayette, Indiana, and the flagship campus of the Purdue University system. The university was founded in 1869 after Lafayette businessman John Purdue donated land and money to establish a college of science, technology, and agriculture in his name. The first classes were held on September 16, 1874, with six instructors and 39 students. It has been ranked as among the best public universities in the United States by major institutional rankings, and is renowned for its engineering program.

The main campus in West Lafayette offers more than 200 majors for undergraduates, over 70 masters and doctoral programs, and professional degrees in pharmacy, veterinary medicine, and doctor of nursing practice. In addition, Purdue has 18 intercollegiate sports teams and more than 900 student organizations. Purdue is the founding member of the Big Ten Conference and enrolls the largest student body of any individual university campus in Indiana, as well as the ninth-largest foreign student population of any university in the United States.

Purdue University is a member of the Association of American Universities and is classified among "R1: Doctoral Universities – Very high research activity". Purdue faculty, students, alumni and other affiliates have reached many notable and influential positions in business, media, politics, and science. Purdue has been affiliated with 13 Nobel laureates, 1 Turing Award laureate, 2 World Food Prize laureates, 3 Pulitzer Prize winners, 18 Olympic medalists, 3 National Medal of Technology and Innovation recipients, 2 National Medal of Science recipients, 3 Presidential Medal of Freedom recipients, 7 members of Congress, 3 U.S. governors, and 2 heads of state. Purdue has over 400,000 living alumni. Its alumni have included 26 astronauts, 6 current Fortune 500 CEOs, 2 Rhodes Scholars, 4 Truman Scholars and 3 Gates Scholars.

History

In 1865, the Indiana General Assembly voted to take advantage of the Morrill Land-Grant Colleges Act of 1862 and began plans to establish an institution with a focus on agriculture and engineering. Communities throughout the state offered facilities and funding in bids for the location of the new college. Popular proposals included the addition of an agriculture department at Indiana State University, at what is now Butler University.

On May 6, 1869, the General Assembly established the institution in Tippecanoe County as Purdue University, in the name of the principal benefactor. Classes began at Purdue on September 16, 1874, with six instructors and 39 students. Professor John S. Hougham was Purdue’s first faculty member and served as acting president between the administrations of presidents Shortridge and White. A campus of five buildings was completed by the end of 1874. In 1875, Sarah A. Oren, the State Librarian of Indiana, was appointed Professor of Botany.

Purdue issued its first degree, a Bachelor of Science in chemistry, in 1875. The first female student was admitted that autumn.

Emerson E. White, the university’s president from 1876 to 1883, followed a strict interpretation of the Morrill Act. Rather than emulate the classical universities, White believed Purdue should be an "industrial college" and devote its resources toward providing a broad, liberal education with an emphasis on science, technology, and agriculture. He intended not only to prepare students for industrial work, but also to prepare them to be good citizens and family members.

Part of White's plan to distinguish Purdue from classical universities included a controversial attempt to ban fraternities, which was ultimately overturned by the Indiana Supreme Court, leading to White's resignation. The next president, James H. Smart, is remembered for his call in 1894 to rebuild the original Heavilon Hall "one brick higher" after it had been destroyed by a fire.

By the end of the nineteenth century, the university was organized into schools of agriculture, engineering (mechanical, civil, and electrical), and pharmacy; former U.S. President Benjamin Harrison served on the board of trustees. Purdue's engineering laboratories included testing facilities for a locomotive, and for a Corliss steam engine—one of the most efficient engines of the time. The School of Agriculture shared its research with farmers throughout the state, with its cooperative extension services, and would undergo a period of growth over the following two decades. Programs in education and home economics were soon established, as well as a short-lived school of medicine. By 1925, Purdue had the largest undergraduate engineering enrollment in the country, a status it would keep for half a century.

President Edward C. Elliott oversaw a campus building program between the world wars. Inventor, alumnus, and trustee David E. Ross coordinated several fundraisers, donated lands to the university, and was instrumental in establishing the Purdue Research Foundation. Ross's gifts and fundraisers supported such projects as Ross–Ade Stadium, the Memorial Union, a civil engineering surveying camp, and Purdue University Airport. Purdue Airport was the country's first university-owned airport and the site of the country's first college-credit flight training courses.

Amelia Earhart joined the Purdue faculty in 1935 as a consultant for these flight courses and as a counselor on women's careers. In 1937, the Purdue Research Foundation provided the funds for the Lockheed Electra 10-E Earhart flew on her attempted round-the-world flight.

Every school and department at the university was involved in some type of military research or training during World War II. During a project on radar receivers, Purdue physicists discovered properties of germanium that led to the making of the first transistor. The Army and the Navy conducted training programs at Purdue and more than 17,500 students, staff, and alumni served in the armed forces. Purdue set up about a hundred centers throughout Indiana to train skilled workers for defense industries. As veterans returned to the university under the G.I. Bill, first-year classes were taught at some of these sites to alleviate the demand for campus space. Four of these sites are now degree-granting regional campuses of the Purdue University system. On-campus housing became racially desegregated in 1947, following pressure from Purdue President Frederick L. Hovde and Indiana Governor Ralph F. Gates.

After the war, Hovde worked to expand the academic opportunities at the university. A decade-long construction program emphasized science and research. In the late 1950s and early 1960s the university established programs in veterinary medicine, industrial management, and nursing, as well as the first computer science department in the United States. Undergraduate humanities courses were strengthened, although Hovde only reluctantly approved of graduate-level study in these areas. Purdue awarded its first Bachelor of Arts degrees in 1960. The programs in liberal arts and education, formerly administered by the School of Science, were soon split into an independent school.

The official seal of Purdue was officially inaugurated during the university's centennial in 1969. Consisting of elements from emblems that had been used unofficially since the 1890s, the current seal depicts a griffin, symbolizing strength, and a three-part shield, representing education, research, and service.

In 1975, Purdue University joined ARPANET, an early packet-switching network that would ultimately become the foundation for the modern internet.

In recent years, Purdue's leaders have continued to support high-tech research and international programs. In 1987, U.S. President Ronald Reagan visited the West Lafayette campus to give a speech about the influence of technological progress on job creation.

In the 1990s, the university added more opportunities to study abroad and expanded its course offerings in world languages and cultures. The first buildings of the Discovery Park interdisciplinary research center were dedicated in 2004.

Purdue launched a Global Policy Research Institute in 2010 to explore the potential impact of technical knowledge on public policy decisions.

On April 27, 2017, Purdue University announced plans to acquire for-profit college Kaplan University and convert it to a public university in the state of Indiana, subject to multiple levels of approval. That school now operates as Purdue University Global, and aims to serve adult learners.

Integration
Purdue had black graduates by the 1890s, and in 1905 a Black man ran for its track team. But some time in the 1910s the teams became segregated, and remained so until a student protest in 1947. Black students were not allowed to live in the residence halls until the 1940s. Black males were able to live in cooperatives, but Black females were not allowed to live anywhere in West Lafayette. In 1946 the women's dormitories were integrated by an order of the governor of Indiana.

Helen Williams became the first Black faculty member in 1968.

Campuses
Purdue's campus is situated in the small city of West Lafayette, near the western bank of the Wabash River, across which sits the larger city of Lafayette. State Street, which is concurrent with State Road 26, divides the northern and southern portions of campus. Academic buildings are mostly concentrated on the eastern and southern parts of campus, with residence halls and intramural fields to the west, and athletic facilities to the north. The Greater Lafayette Public Transportation Corporation (CityBus) operates eight campus loop bus routes on which students, faculty, and staff can ride free of charge with Purdue Identification.

Purdue Mall

The Purdue Mall is the central quad of Purdue University and was created to connect the academic campus with Ross-Ade Stadium. It is also known as the Engineering Mall due to its proximity to several engineering buildings. The most prominent feature of the Purdue Mall is the -tall concrete Engineering Fountain, and also features the Frederick L. Hovde Hall of Administration, which houses the office of the university president, Mitchell E. Daniels.

The Purdue Bell Tower is between the Stadium and Centennial Malls. The Bell Tower is considered an icon of the university and can be found on many Purdue logos and those of the cities of Lafayette and West Lafayette.

Southwest of the Stadium Mall is the Edward C. Elliott Hall of Music, one of the largest proscenium theaters in the world. Elliott Hall of Music serves as the home of the Purdue "All-American" Marching Band, Purdue Bands and Orchestras, the WBAA studio. Purdue's Student Concert Committee often invites famous entertainers to perform there for an audience of students, faculty, and the public.

West of the Elliott Hall of Music is the Armory Building. The Armory Building was rebuilt in 1918 after a fire and houses the university's ROTC programs and other clubs. In March 2019, university president Mitch Daniels described a proposal to repurpose the Armory Building, suggesting the space may be used for residential dining, retail, or classrooms but later said no changes would be made.

Memorial Mall

The Purdue Memorial Mall, south of the Purdue Mall, is the original section of campus. A popular meeting place for students, the grassy, open Memorial Mall is surrounded by the Stewart Center, Wetherill Laboratory of Chemistry, Stanley Coulter Hall, the Class of 1950 Lecture Hall, the Recitation Building, University Hall, and Stone Hall. The Memorial Mall also features the Hello Walk.

Near this section of campus is Felix Haas Hall, which was constructed in 1909 as Memorial Gymnasium in memory of the 17 Purdue University football players, coaches, alumni, and fans who perished in the Purdue Wreck railroad accident on October 31, 1903. The structure was renovated in 1985 to house the Computer Science department. In 2006, it was renamed in honor of retired Provost Felix Haas and began to also house the Statistics department. East of the Memorial Mall is the Purdue Memorial Union, Purdue's student union building, and the adjacent Union Club Hotel.

University Hall is the only building remaining from the original six-building campus. Construction began in 1871, when the building was known as "The Main Building". The building was dedicated in 1877 and the project cost $35,000 to complete. University Hall originally housed the office of the president, a chapel, and classrooms, but was remodeled in 1961 to house only the department of history and classrooms used by the School of Liberal Arts. At the request of John Purdue, he was buried in the Memorial Mall, directly across from the main entrance of University Hall.

South Campus

The area south of State Street is home to Purdue's agricultural, fine arts, life sciences, and veterinary buildings. This area also includes the Krannert School of Management, Horticulture Gardens, Discovery Park, Lyles Porter Hall and the Purdue Airport. The Krannert School of Management has been nationally and globally ranked for both undergraduate and graduate degree programs. Krannert and Rawls Hall provide state of the art learning facilities to the majority of business classes on campus. Rawls Hall was built in 2006 with the help of a $10 million gift from Jerry S. Rawls, the largest in the management school's history.

Lyles Porter Hall houses interdisciplinary healthcare facilities and classroom space within the College of Health and Human Sciences as well as the West Lafayette branch of the Indiana University School of Medicine. Collectively, students and clinical faculty within Nursing, Health and Kinesiology, Nutrition Science, Psychological Sciences, and Speech, Language and Hearing Sciences see approximately 3,000 patients a year within this state-of-the-art interdisciplinary healthcare facility. The building features a nursing clinic, specialized preschool, exercise center, consultation space and demonstration kitchen for dietitians in training, clinical psychology facility, audiology and speech-language pathology clinics, cadaver laboratory for physicians in training, and research laboratories.

Purdue University Airport, which opened in 1930 was the first of its kind and remains one of only a few university-owned airports in the nation. Including the Niswonger Aviation Technology Building, which was dedicated in 2009, the facility symbolizes Purdue's storied relationship with aviation.

West Campus
The western portion of campus consists of student housing, dining, and recreation facilities. Students can play club and intramural sports at the Córdova Recreational Sports Center, the Morgan J. Burke Aquatic Center (named for former Purdue Men's Swimming & Diving Captain and longtime Vice President & Athletics Director), and the intramural playing fields in this area. The Córdova Recreational Sports Center, built in 1957, is the first building in the nation created solely to serve university student recreational needs. As a replacement for the previously separate women's and men's gymnasiums, it was originally called the "Co-recreational Gymnasium". Despite several expansions and official name changes, it has been nicknamed "the Co-rec" ever since.

Stadium Avenue

Much of the northern part of campus sits on land purchased for the university by industrialist David E. Ross and author and humorist George Ade in the 1920s. Many of Purdue's athletic facilities are there, including Ross–Ade Stadium (American football), Mackey Arena (basketball), and Lambert Fieldhouse (indoor track and field). This area also includes the Slayter Center of Performing Arts and Cary Quadrangle, one of the largest all-male housing units in the country.

Ross is one of three people buried on Purdue's campus, the others being John Purdue and former First Lady of Purdue, Jane Beering. Ross's and Beering's grave sites are in a garden atop Slayter Hill just to the west of the Slayter bandshell. Beering's husband, former Purdue President Steven Beering, will eventually join her atop the hill. Baseball's Alexander Field and other athletic facilities are a mile west of the stadium, at the newer Northwest Athletic Complex.

Organization and administration

The university president, appointed by the board of trustees, is the chief administrative officer of the university. The office of the president oversees admission and registration, student conduct and counseling, the administration and scheduling of classes and space, the administration of student athletics and organized extracurricular activities, the libraries, the appointment of the faculty and conditions of their employment, the appointment of all non-faculty employees and the conditions of employment, the general organization of the university, and the planning and administration of the university budget.

The Board of Trustees directly appoints other major officers of the university including a provost who serves as the chief academic officer for the university, several vice presidents with oversight over specific university operations, and the regional campus chancellors.

Academics

Admissions

Undergraduate 

The 2022 annual ranking of U.S. News & World Report categorizes Purdue University-West Lafayette as "more selective". For the Class of 2025 (enrolled fall 2021), Purdue received 59,173 applications and accepted 40,759 (68.9%). Of those accepted, 10,157 enrolled, a yield rate (the percentage of accepted students who choose to attend the university) of 24.9%. Purdue's freshman retention rate is 92%, with 81.5% going on to graduate within six years.

The university started test-optional admissions with the Fall 2021 incoming class in response to the COVID-19 pandemic and has extended this through Fall 2023. Of the 62% of the incoming freshman class who submitted SAT scores; the middle 50 percent Composite scores were 1190-1430. Of the 31% of enrolled freshmen in 2021 who submitted ACT scores; the middle 50 percent Composite score was between 26 and 33.

Purdue University is a college-sponsor of the National Merit Scholarship Program and sponsored 88 Merit Scholarship awards in 2020. In the 2020–2021 academic year, 127 freshman students were National Merit Scholars.

Academic divisions

Purdue offers both undergraduate and graduate programs in over 211 major areas of study, and is well known for its competitive engineering curricula. The university has also been integral in America's history of aviation, having established the first college credit offered in flight training; the first four-year bachelor's degree in aviation; and the first university airport: Purdue University Airport. Purdue's aviation technology and aeronautical engineering programs remain among the most competitive aviation-specific programs in the world. In the mid-20th century, Purdue's aviation program expanded to encompass advanced spaceflight technology, giving rise to Purdue's nicknames Cradle of Astronauts and Mother of Astronauts. 26 Purdue graduates have become astronauts, including Gus Grissom, one of the original Mercury Seven astronauts; Neil Armstrong, who was the first person to walk on the moon; and Eugene Cernan, who was the last person to walk on the moon.

The English department at Purdue launched the first Online Writing Lab (OWL), in 1994. Many colleges and universities use the Purdue OWL website as an academic writing reference source for proper word usage, punctuation, grammar, and style.

Purdue is organized into 10 colleges and schools. On July 1, 2010, the College of Health and Human Sciences was formed, through combining existing academic units, including the School of Nursing, the School of Health Sciences, the College of Consumer and Family Sciences, and non-humanities majors psychology and hearing and speech pathology from the College of Liberal Arts.

College of Agriculture
The university's College of Agriculture supports the university's agricultural, food, life, and natural resource science programs. The college also supports the university's charge as a land-grant university to support agriculture throughout the state; its agricultural extension program plays a key role in this.

College of Education

The College of Education offers undergraduate degrees in elementary education, social studies education, science education and special education, and graduate degrees in these and many other specialty areas of education. It has two departments: (a) Curriculum and Instruction and (b) Educational Studies.

College of Engineering

The Purdue University College of Engineering was established in 1874 with programs in Civil and Mechanical Engineering. The college now offers BS, MS, and PhD degrees in more than a dozen disciplines. Purdue's engineering program has also educated 24 of America's astronauts, including Neil Armstrong and Eugene Cernan who were the first and last astronauts to have walked on the Moon, respectively, and Gus Grissom, a member of the Mercury Seven. Many of Purdue's engineering disciplines are recognized as top-ten programs in the U.S. The college as a whole is currently ranked 4th in the U.S. of all doctorate-granting engineering schools by U.S. News & World Report.

Exploratory Studies
The university's Exploratory Studies program supports undergraduate students who enter the university without having a declared major. It was founded as a pilot program in 1995 and made a permanent program in 1999.

College of Health and Human Sciences

The College of Health and Human Sciences was established in 2010 and is the newest college. It offers BS, MS and PhD degrees in all 10 of its academic units.

College of Liberal Arts
Purdue's College of Liberal Arts contains the arts, social sciences and humanities programs at the university. Liberal arts courses have been taught at Purdue since its founding in 1874. The School of Science, Education, and Humanities was formed in 1953. In 1963, the School of Humanities, Social Sciences, and Education was established, although Bachelor of Arts degrees had begun to be conferred as early as 1959. In 1989, the School of Liberal Arts was created to encompass Purdue's arts, humanities, and social sciences programs, while education programs were split off into the newly formed School of Education. The School of Liberal Arts was renamed the College of Liberal Arts in 2005.

Daniels School of Business

The Daniels School of Business offers management courses and programs at the undergraduate, master's, and doctoral levels.

College of Pharmacy

The university's College of Pharmacy was established in 1884 and is the 3rd oldest state-funded school of pharmacy in the United States. The school offers two undergraduate programs leading to the BS in Pharmaceutical Sciences (BSPS) and the Doctor of Pharmacy (Pharm.D.) professional degree. Graduate programs leading to MS and PhD degrees are offered in three departments (Industrial and Physical Pharmacy, Medicinal Chemistry and Molecular Pharmacology, and Pharmacy Practice). Additionally, the school offers several non-degree certificate programs and post-graduate continuing education activities.

Purdue Polytechnic Institute

The Purdue Polytechnic Institute, formerly known as the College of Technology, offers bachelor's, master's and PhD degrees in a wide range of technology-related disciplines. With over 30,000 living alumni, it is one of the largest technology schools in the United States. In addition to the main school in West Lafayette, Purdue Polytechnic operates nine satellite campuses in Anderson, Columbus, Indianapolis, Kokomo, Lafayette, New Albany, Richmond, Vincennes, and South Bend. These locations offer certificate, associate, and/or bachelor's degrees, some of which are ABET-accredited technical degrees.

The Polytechnic Institute also maintains three high school campuses (two in Indianapolis and one in South Bend) that focus on science, technology, engineering, and mathematics and feature hands-on project-based learning.

College of Science

The university's College of Science houses the university's science departments: Biological Sciences; Chemistry; Computer Science; Earth, Atmospheric, & Planetary Sciences; Mathematics; Physics & Astronomy; and Statistics. The science courses offered by the college account for about one-fourth of Purdue's one million student credit hours.

College of Veterinary Medicine

The College of Veterinary Medicine is accredited by the AVMA to offer the Doctor of Veterinary Medicine degree, associate's and bachelor's degrees in veterinary technology, master's and PhD degrees, and residency programs leading to specialty board certification. Within the state of Indiana, the Purdue University College of Veterinary Medicine is the only veterinary school, while the Indiana University School of Medicine is one of only two medical schools (the other being Marian University College of Osteopathic Medicine). The two schools frequently collaborate on medical research projects.

Honors College
Purdue's Honors College supports an honors program for undergraduate students at the university.

The Graduate School
The university's Graduate School supports graduate students at the university.

Purdue Online
Through Purdue Online, the administrative unit charged with planning and enabling the effort, Purdue has a growing online presence, in addition to Purdue Global, offering more than 200 programs through the university's four accredited institutions (Purdue West Lafayette, Purdue Northwest and Purdue Fort Wayne in Indiana and Purdue Global) including master's degree programs. Purdue Online, the unified online education initiative approved by Purdue President Mitch Daniels and the Purdue Board of Trustees in December 2018, is intended to radically expand these offerings by developing a "coordinated, unified system-wide portfolio of online course and degree offerings for students of all types." Students manage their Purdue University admin account using the BrightSpace Purdue Student Portal.

Research
The university expended $622.814 million in support of research system-wide in 2017, using funds received from the state and federal governments, industry, foundations, and individual donors. The faculty and more than 400 research laboratories put Purdue University among the leading research institutions. Purdue University is considered by the Carnegie Classification of Institutions of Higher Education to have "very high research activity". Purdue also was rated the nation's fourth best place to work in academia, according to rankings released in November 2007 by The Scientist magazine. Purdue's researchers provide insight, knowledge, assistance, and solutions in many crucial areas. These include, but are not limited to Agriculture; Business and Economy; Education; Engineering; Environment; Healthcare; Individuals, Society, Culture; Manufacturing; Science; Technology; Veterinary Medicine.
The Global Trade Analysis Project (GTAP), a global research consortium focused on global economic governance challenges (trade, climate, resource use) is also coordinated by the university. Purdue University generated a record $438 million in sponsored research funding during the 2009–10 fiscal year with participation from National Science Foundation, National Aeronautics and Space Administration, and the U.S. departments of Agriculture, Defense, Energy, and Health and Human Services. Purdue University was ranked fourth in Engineering research expenditures amongst all the colleges in the United States in 2017, with a research expenditure budget of 244.8 million.

Purdue University established the Discovery Park to bring innovation through multidisciplinary action. In all of the eleven centers of Discovery Park, ranging from entrepreneurship to energy and advanced manufacturing, research projects reflect a large economic impact and address global challenges. Purdue University's nanotechnology research program, built around the new Birck Nanotechnology Center in Discovery Park, ranks among the best in the nation.

The Purdue Research Park which opened in 1961 was developed by Purdue Research Foundation which is a private, nonprofit foundation created to assist Purdue. The park is focused on companies operating in the arenas of life sciences, homeland security, engineering, advanced manufacturing and information technology. It provides an interactive environment for experienced Purdue researchers and for private business and high-tech industry. It currently employs more than 3,000 people in 155 companies, including 90 technology-based firms. The Purdue Research Park was ranked first by the Association of University Research Parks in 2004.

Purdue's library system consists of fifteen locations throughout the campus, including an archives and special collections research center, an undergraduate library, and several subject-specific libraries. More than three million volumes, including one million electronic books, are held at these locations. The Library houses the Amelia Earhart Collection, a collection of notes and letters belonging to Earhart and her husband George Putnam along with records related to her disappearance and subsequent search efforts. An administrative unit of Purdue University Libraries, Purdue University Press has its roots in the 1960 founding of Purdue University Studies by President Frederick Hovde on a $12,000 grant from the Purdue Research Foundation. This was the result of a committee appointed by President Hovde after the Department of English lamented the lack of publishing venues in the humanities. Since the 1990s, the range of books published by the Press has grown to reflect the work from other colleges at Purdue University especially in the areas of agriculture, health, and engineering. Purdue University Press publishes print and ebook monograph series in a range of subject areas from literary and cultural studies to the study of the human-animal bond. In 1993 Purdue University Press was admitted to membership of the Association of American University Presses. Purdue University Press publishes around 25 books a year and 20 learned journals in print, in print & online, and online-only formats in collaboration with Purdue University Libraries.

Sustainability
Purdue's Sustainability Council, composed of university administrators and professors, meets monthly to discuss environmental issues and sustainability initiatives at Purdue. The university's first LEED Certified building was an addition to the Mechanical Engineering Building, which was completed in Fall 2011. The school is also in the process of developing an arboretum on campus. In addition, a system has been set up to display live data detailing current energy production at the campus utility plant. The school holds an annual "Green Week" each fall, an effort to engage the Purdue community with issues relating to environmental sustainability.

Rankings

In its 2022 edition, U.S. News & World Report ranked Purdue University the 7th most innovative national university, tied for the 18th best public university in the United States, tied for 51st overall, and 127th best global university. U.S. News & World Report also rated Purdue tied for 36th in "Best Undergraduate Teaching, 81st in "Best Value Schools", tied for 326th in "Top Performers on Social Mobility", and the undergraduate engineering program tied for 9th at schools whose highest degree is a doctorate.

Campus life

Student body

8,562 students from 126 countries around the world attended Purdue University in 2012. In 2012–13, 19,689 out of a total of 39,256 students enrolled were Indiana residents. , the racial diversity of the US-resident undergraduate student body was 5.7% Asian, 4.4% Hispanic or Latino, and 4.0% black or African American. Of the undergraduate students, 42.6% were female. Domestic minorities constitute a total of 10.8% in the graduate student body population of which 37.3% are female. Twenty-two percent of the student body is international, representing 126 countries. In graduate and professional student population, non-Indiana residents occupy an overwhelming majority, about 75%. Almost all undergraduates and about 70% of the graduate student population attend full-time. The school's selectivity for admissions is "more selective" by USNWR: approximately 49% of applicants are admitted.

Housing
About one-third of the single undergraduate students on the West Lafayette campus live in university-owned buildings. The rest live in fraternities, sororities, cooperatives, or private off-campus housing. There are 11,844 spaces available for undergraduate students, graduate students, and student families who choose to live on campus. Sixteen percent of the undergraduate student body are members of the 40 fraternities and 20 sororities on campus.

Purdue University operates seventeen separate residence halls for its undergraduate and graduate students, including Cary Quadrangle, Earhart Hall, First Street Towers, Frieda Parker Hall, Harrison Hall, Hawkins Hall, Hillenbrand Hall, Hilltop Apartments, Honors College and Residences, McCutcheon Hall, Meredith Hall, Meredith South Hall, Owen Hall, Purdue Village, Shreve Hall, Tarkington Hall, Wiley Hall, Winifred Parker Hall, and the 5 Windsor Halls: Duhme, Shealy, Warren, Wood, and Vawter. Of the residence halls, Cary, McCutcheon, Wiley, and Tarkington are male-only while Windsor, Meredith South Hall, and Meredith Hall are female-only; the rest of them are co-ed.

There are 12 cooperative houses at Purdue (five men's houses and seven women's houses). The men's houses include Circle Pines, Fairway, Marwood, Chauncey, and Gemini. The women's houses include Ann Tweedale, Glenwood, Twin Pines, Maclure, Stewart, Devonshire, and Shoemaker. All cooperative houses are governed under the Purdue Cooperative Council which is led by Purdue University students who live in these houses. The cooperative system allows for a much lower cost of living than other types of housing, averaging $2900 annually with all-inclusive monthly rent ranging from $250–$625 varying by house. The members take an active role in sharing chores and cooking all meals themselves, as opposed to hiring out cleaning and cooking staff.

Purdue University hosts one of the nation's largest Greek community, with approximately 6,000 students participating in one of the roughly 40 men's fraternities or 30 women's sororities. Several of Purdue's most distinguished graduates are members of fraternities and sororities. Purdue's Greek system is very strong and works together in various aspects, including the Inter-Fraternity Council, Panhellenic, and many very successful philanthropies. Every chapter has national philanthropy dedicated to a certain cause that many chapters also participate in. Besides philanthropy, Purdue Greeks are involved all over campus, including College Mentors for Kids, Purdue University Dance Marathon, Boiler Gold Rush, Purdue Student Government, and other activities.

Activities and events

Students at Purdue participate in more than 900 student organizations that cover a variety of interests. Some of the notable clubs founded by Purdue students include the Purdue Reamer Club (a school spirit organization that cares for the Boilermaker Special mascot and raises funds for scholarships) and two clubs that eventually became nationwide organizations: the National Society of Black Engineers and the Rube Goldberg Machine Contest.

Several campus-wide programs are planned by the Purdue Alumni Student Experience (part of the Alumni Association), Purdue Student Union Board, Purdue Student Government (PSG), or the Purdue Graduate Student Government (PGSG). PSG and PGSG are made up of representatives from each of the university's academic colleges and give recommendations to the faculty, administration, and sometimes to the state legislature.

Annual campus events include Boiler Gold Rush, Purdue University Dance Marathon, Spring Fest, and Grand Prix. Boiler Gold Rush (BGR) is Purdue's new-student orientation program. BGR, which takes place before each fall semester, was formed to ease the transition to college for incoming students and to help them get acquainted with successful college life. Boiler Gold Rush activities include speaker presentations from various academic, cultural, safety and professional organizations on campus, campus tours led by Team Leaders, academic 'meet the schools' picnic and interest sessions, late-night events at the Purdue Memorial Union, Recreational Sports Center and local stores, and a sports pep rally. Purdue University Dance Marathon (PUDM) is an 18-hour no-sitting, no-sleeping, dance marathon that takes place each fall in the Cordova Recreation center. Each year over 2,000 students participate and the event raises over $1 million annually for Riley Hospital for Children in Indianapolis. PUDM is also one of the largest collegiate Dance Marathons in the country. Spring Fest is an annual carnival with entertaining exhibits from many academic departments. A highlight of the weekend is the Entomology Department's Bug Bowl, where the sport of cricket spitting was invented in 1997. The Purdue Grand Prix, a 50-mile, 160-lap go-kart race is "The Greatest Spectacle in College Racing" and wraps up Gala Week each year. All 33 participating karts are made from scratch by student teams. The event has been raising money for student scholarships since it began in 1958.

Religious life
Purdue has a number of religious organizations on and near the campus. St. Thomas Aquinas Catholic Church serves the Catholic community at Purdue and the surrounding community. There is also a non-denominational Christian church, Campus House, which is affiliated with the popular coffee-shop Greyhouse Coffee. The Purdue Hillel Foundation and Chabad at Purdue are the university's Jewish campus organizations. The Islamic Society of Greater Lafayette has an Islamic center serving the needs of the Muslim community on campus.

Media
The Purdue Exponent, an independent student newspaper, has the largest circulation of any Indiana college newspaper, with a daily circulation of 17,500 copies during the spring and fall semesters. From 1889 to 2008 Purdue published a yearbook called the Debris.

WBAA is a professional radio station operation owned by and licensed to Purdue University. The station operates three noncommercial stations: WBAA News, WBAA Classical, and WBAA Jazz. The stations can be heard on AM920, 101.3 FM, and 105.9 FM. WBAA also broadcasts on HD Radio and digital platforms including wbaa.org and the WBAA app. Its studios are in the Edward C. Elliott Hall of Music on the Purdue campus, and the transmitters are in Lafayette, Indiana. WBAA is the longest continuously-operating radio station in Indiana, having been licensed on April 4, 1922. WBAA is a NPR member station. Despite some public disapproval, in 2022, Purdue sold WBAA to WFYI-FM. Purdue received $700,000 in underwriting credit while agreeing to provide an investment of $250,000 annually for two years to WFYI to offset initial operating costs.   

There are also a few campus radio stations on campus. Currently, three radio stations operate from residence halls, broadcasting via internet only; WCCR from Cary Quadrangle (not to be confused with the current WCCR FM or WCCR-LP stations in other states), WILY from Wiley Hall, and WHHR from Harrison Hall.

W9YB is the callsign of the Amateur Radio Club at Purdue University. W9YB is the longest standing club on campus and also holds the self-declared title of having one of the largest and most active collegiate amateur radio stations in the country. W9YB actively participates in emergency management for the Tippecanoe County area and maintains ready status with its members in skills to assist. W9YB is among the longest standing amateur radio clubs in the United States, with the current callsign dating back to 1932 and the previous callsign 9YB dating back to 1920.

The "Movie Tribute Show" was created in a small television studio (now known as the Erik Mygrant Studio) on campus in 1999.

Athletics

On October 26, 1891, a newspaper in Crawfordsville, Indiana, called Purdue's football team the "Boiler Makers" when writing about their trouncing of Wabash College. Lafayette newspapers soon picked up the name, and in October 1892, The Purdue Exponent, Purdue's student newspaper, gave it the stamp of approval. In the early days of Purdue football, the team was called other names as well, including "haymakers," "railsplitters," "sluggers," and "cornfield sailors." This heritage is reflected in Purdue's official mascot: the Boilermaker Special (a truck-like vehicle that resembles a locomotive) and the athletic mascot Purdue Pete (a muscular hammer-wielding boilermaker). The school colors of old gold and black were selected by Purdue's first football team in 1887 to resemble the orange and black of Princeton's then-successful team. The best known fight song is "Hail Purdue!".

Purdue has one of the few college athletic programs not funded by student fees or subsidized by the university. It is home to 18 Division I/I-A NCAA teams including football, basketball, cross country, tennis, wrestling, golf, volleyball, ice hockey (ACHA), and others. Purdue is a founding member of the Big Ten Conference, and played a central role in its creation. Traditional rivals include Big Ten colleagues the Indiana Hoosiers (see Indiana–Purdue rivalry), the Illinois Fighting Illini, and the Notre Dame Fighting Irish from the Atlantic Coast Conference (football program independent, however).

Purdue's baseball facility was named in honor of two alumni, Anna Margaret Ross Alexander and her husband, John Arthur Alexander, when the new stadium was dedicated in 2013.

Football

The Boilermaker football team represents Purdue University in the NCAA Football Bowl Subdivision (FBS). Ryan Walters is Purdue's current head coach, the 37th in the program's history. Purdue plays its home games at Ross-Ade Stadium on the campus of Purdue University in West Lafayette, Indiana. The Boilermakers compete in the Big Ten Conference as a member of the West Division. With a 592–515–48 record, Purdue has the 49th most victories among NCAA FBS programs. Purdue was originally classified as a Major College school in the 1937 season until 1972. Purdue received Division I classification in 1973, becoming a Division I-A program from 1978 to 2006 and an FBS program from 2006 to the present. The Boilermakers have registered 64 winning seasons in their history, with 19 of those seasons resulting in eight victories or more, 10 seasons resulting in at least nine wins, and just one season with ten victories or more. Of those successful campaigns, Purdue has produced five unbeaten seasons in its history, going 4–0 in 1891, 8–0 in 1892, 8–0 in 1929, 7–0–1 in 1932 and 9–0 in 1943. The Boilermakers have won a total of 12 conference championships in their history, including four Indiana Intercollegiate Athletic Association titles and eight Big Ten Conference titles. The program is also notable for being one of only two universities – the other being the University of Alabama – to produce three Super Bowl-winning quarterbacks.

Found on a farm in southern Indiana, the Old Oaken Bucket is one of the oldest American football trophies. The winner of Purdue's annual game against the Indiana University Hoosiers gets to keep the trophy until the next face-off and add a bronze "P" or "I" link to its chain. The first competition in 1925 led to a 0–0 tie, resulting in the first link on the chain being an "IP." , Purdue leads the series 74–42–6.

During "Breakfast Club", best described as a cross between a pep rally and a Halloween party, students and even some alumni dress up in costumes, from traditional Halloween garb to creative hand-made costumes, as they bar-hop before Boilermaker home football games. The Breakfast Club plays a significant role during the football season and is informally a part of Purdue tradition. Many Boilermaker fans are dedicated; getting up at 5:00 a.m. on Saturdays and lining up at the bars on Chauncey Hill and the levee by 6:00 a.m. on game days. The Breakfast Club tradition also takes place the day of the annual Purdue Grand Prix race in April.

Basketball
The Purdue Boilermakers basketball team competes in NCAA Division I and is a member of the Big Ten Conference. In 2005, Matt Painter became the head coach in West Lafayette. Painter took over the head coaching job from the winningest coach in school history, Gene Keady, becoming the second former Boilermaker basketball player to take the lead role. Purdue basketball won its 24th Big Ten Conference Championship in 2019. This mark leads the conference, as Indiana University is second with 22. The Boilermakers have reached two NCAA Tournament Final Fours and won a non-NCAA recognized National Championship for the 1932 season, awarded several years later by the Helms Athletic Foundation. It has sent more than 30 players to the NBA including two overall No. 1 picks in the NBA draft. Purdue shares a traditional rivalry with in-state foe Indiana University and holds a 120–89 series lead. The Boilermaker men's and women's basketball teams have won more Big Ten Championships than any other conference school, with 31 regular-season conference titles and 10 Big Ten Tournament titles. Purdue men's basketball has an all-time winning record against all Big Ten schools except Ohio State, who hold a 90–88 overall record against the Boilermakers.

On March 17, 2023, Purdue was defeated in the first round of March Madness by Fairleigh Dickinson University, a number 16 seed to Purdue’s number 1 ranking. Making this the second time in history a 16 seed beat a number 1 seed.

People

Faculty

The original faculty of six in 1874 has grown to 2,563 tenured and tenure-track faculty in the Purdue Statewide System by Fall 2007 totals. The number of faculty and staff members system-wide is 18,872. The current faculty includes scholars such as Arden L. Bement Jr. (director of the National Science Foundation), R. Graham Cooks, Douglas Comer, Louis de Branges de Bourcia (who proved the Bieberbach conjecture), Victor Raskin, David Sanders, Leah Jamieson, James L. Mohler (who has written several manuals of computer graphics), and Samuel S. Wagstaff Jr. (inventor of the Wagstaff prime).

Purdue's tenured faculty comprises sixty Academic Deans, Associate Deans, and Assistant Deans; 63 Academic Department Heads; 753 Professors; 547 Associate Professors; and 447 Assistant Professors. Purdue employs 892 non-tenure-track faculty, Lecturers, and Postdoctoral Researchers at its West Lafayette campus. Purdue employs another 691 tenured and 1,021 Non-Tenure Track Faculty, Lecturers, and Postdoctoral Researchers at its Regional Campuses and Statewide Technology unit.

Two faculty members (chemists Herbert C. Brown and Ei-ichi Negishi) have been awarded Nobel Prizes while at Purdue. In all, 13 Nobel Prizes in five fields have been associated with Purdue including students, researchers, and current and previous faculty. Other notable faculty of the past have included Golden Gate Bridge designer Charles Alton Ellis, efficiency expert Lillian Gilbreth, food safety advocate Harvey Wiley, aviator Amelia Earhart, president of the National Association of Mathematicians Edray Goins, radio pioneer Reginald Fessenden, and Yeram S. Touloukian, founder of the Thermophysical Properties Research Center.

Alumni

Purdue alumni have achieved recognition in a range of areas, particularly in the science, engineering, and aviation industries. The university's alumni pool collectively holds over 15,000 United States patents.

Purdue alumni include 25 astronauts, including Gus Grissom, America's second man in space and first to fly in NASA's Gemini program, Neil Armstrong, the first to walk on the Moon, and Eugene Cernan, the last astronaut to do so. Over one-third of all of NASA's crewed space missions have had at least one Purdue graduate as a crew member.

In science, Purdue has also produced Nobel Prize–winning physicists in Edward Mills Purcell and Ben Roy Mottelson, as well as Nobel Prize–winning chemist Akira Suzuki. Other noted Purdue alumni in science include pioneer of robotics and remote control technology Thomas B. Sheridan; Debian founder Ian Murdock; Chinese physicist Deng Jiaxian, a founding father and key contributor to the Chinese nuclear weapon programs; mathematician Yitang Zhang; chemist Lawrence Rocks; biochemist Edwin T. Mertz, credited with the discovery of high-protein corn and beans; Indian chemist CNR Rao, who has been awarded the Bharat Ratna, the highest civilian award in India; engineer Mohamed Atalla who invented the MOS transistor; physical organic chemist and advocate for women and minorities in science Nina Roscher, who received the ACS Award for Encouraging Women into Careers in the Chemical Sciences (1996) and the Presidential Award for Excellence in Science, Mathematics and Engineering Mentoring (1998); and Professor Reuben J. Olembo, a geneticist and environmentalist who went on to become the deputy executive director of UNEP and a UN Assistant Secretary-General, and who was recognised by Purdue in 1994 with a Distinguished Alumni Award for Agriculture.

In business and economics, Purdue alumni include Stephen Bechtel, Jr., owner of Bechtel Corporation; Federal Reserve Bank president Jeffrey Lacker; and popcorn specialist Orville Redenbacher. In 2010, Bloomberg also revealed Purdue was one of the universities in America with the most undergraduate alumni serving as chief executive officers of S&P 500 firms. They are Gregory Wasson, president/CEO of Walgreens; Mark Miller, chairman/president/CEO of Stericycle; Charles Davidson, former chairman/CEO of Noble Energy; Samuel Allen, chairman /president/CEO of Deere & Company; Don Thompson, president/COO of McDonald's; and John C. Martin (businessman), chairman/CEO of Gilead Sciences, Inc.

In government and culture, Purdue alumni include Pulitzer Prize–winners Booth Tarkington and John T. McCutcheon, as well as Ginger Thompson, former New York Times reporter currently with ProPublica; Akinwumi Adesina, former Nigerian minister of Agriculture and Rural development and current President of the African Development Bank; Essam Sharaf, former Egyptian Prime Minister; Tom Moore, theater and television director; James Thomson, CEO of Rand Corporation; Brian Lamb, founder and CEO of C-SPAN; Harry G. Leslie, former Governor of Indiana; Kirk Fordice, former Governor of Mississippi; Earl Butz, former United States Secretary of Agriculture; Birch Bayh, former United States Senator; Herman Cain, 2012 Presidential candidate; David McKinley, current West Virginia Congressman; Sun Li-jen, former Kuomintang general; Rammohan Naidu Kinjarapu, Indian Parliament member; Dulquer Salmaan, Indian film actor; Blake Ragsdale Van Leer, former Georgia Tech president; Anthony W. Miller, former United States Deputy Secretary of Education; and Hugo F. Sonnenschein, former University of Chicago president. Richard O. Klemm, former CEO of Food Warming Equipment and Illinois state legislator, also graduated from Purdue University.

In sports, Purdue has produced basketball coach John Wooden; basketball Hall of Famers Stretch Murphy, Piggy Lambert, and Rick Mount; NBA Champions Paul Hoffman, Herm Gilliam, Frank Kendrick, Jerry Sichting, Glenn Robinson, and Brian Cardinal; and NBA All-Stars Glenn Robinson, Brad Miller, Terry Dischinger, and Joe Barry Carroll. Purdue has three NFL Super Bowl–winning quarterbacks in Drew Brees, Bob Griese, and Len Dawson. Additionally, a total of 19 Purdue alumni have been on a Super Bowl–winning team . Purdue also produced Super Bowl IV winning coach Hank Stram. 2008 Daytona 500 winner Ryan Newman graduated from Purdue with a bachelor's degree in vehicle structure engineering.

Three Purdue alumni have received the Presidential Medal of Freedom, the highest civilian award of the United States: Neil Armstrong, Brian Lamb, and John Wooden.

The Dauch Alumni Center acts as a showcase for the university's alumni. The  center houses the offices of the Purdue Alumni Association and University Development. It is a destination and gathering area for the Purdue Alumni Association's 69,000 members and more than 410,000 living alumni.

Notes

References

Further reading

External links

Purdue Athletics website

 
1869 establishments in Indiana
Air traffic controller schools
Buildings and structures in Tippecanoe County, Indiana
Education in Tippecanoe County, Indiana
Educational institutions established in 1869
Forestry education
Land-grant universities and colleges
Tourist attractions in Tippecanoe County, Indiana
Public universities and colleges in Indiana
West Lafayette, Indiana
Flagship universities in the United States
West Lafayette
Universities and colleges accredited by the Higher Learning Commission